The discography of Gabrielle, an English singer, consists of seven studio albums, three greatest-hits compilations, 28 singles and a number of other appearances.

Her debut single "Dreams" topped the UK Singles Chart in June 1993. Other notable singles include "Going Nowhere", "Give Me a Little More Time", "Walk On By" and "If You Ever"—a duet with East 17. After a few fallow years, Gabrielle made a comeback with "Rise", which in 2000 became her second British number-one single. The album of the same name also reached the top spot in the UK Albums Chart, where it stayed for three weeks. The successful "Out of Reach" from the soundtrack to the film Bridget Jones's Diary reached number four on the UK Singles Chart. Gabrielle's greatest-hits collection Dreams Can Come True, Greatest Hits Vol. 1 was released in 2001.

Albums

Studio albums

Compilation albums

Remix albums

Singles

As lead artist

As featured artist

Music videos

References
General

 
 

Specific

External links
 Official website
 
 Gabrielle at Musicbrainz

Pop music discographies
Rhythm and blues discographies
Discographies of British artists
Blues discographies
Vocal jazz discographies
Soul music discographies